Reward, California may refer to:
Reward, Inyo County, California
Reward, Kern County, California